The sring (also transliterated as ) is a shepherd's flute originating in Armenia. Sring is also the common term for end-blown flutes in general. These flutes are made either of a stork bone, bamboo, wood from the apricot tree or cane and have  or eight finger holes, producing a diatonic scale. The Armenian musicologist Komitas believed that the sring was the most characteristic among the Armenian instruments.

Blul

The  instrument, which is similar in structure to the kaval, is a particular variety of the sring family of flutes. It is often considered a modern evolution of the medieval sring, with the primary differences being the presence of ring-shaped zones, both ends being thickened, and the resulting sound being characterized as velvety and slightly muted.

References

External links 
Armenian Blul-Sring Combo 

Armenian musical instruments
End-blown flutes